The 2012 Derby arson attack occurred on 11 May 2012 at 18 Victory Road, a semi-detached house in a residential street in Osmaston (erroneously reported by the press as being in  Allenton), Derby, Derbyshire, England. Five children died at the scene, while the oldest later died in hospital. The parents of the children, Mairead and Mick Philpott, along with their friend Paul Mosley, were later arrested and charged with murder. In December 2012 their charges were downgraded to manslaughter. On 2 April 2013, Mick Philpott and Paul Mosley were found guilty by unanimous verdicts, while Mairead Philpott was found guilty by majority verdict.

Fire
The children were asleep upstairs in the house when the fire began, with their parents downstairs. Their father, Mick Philpott, was reported to have made "valiant" attempts to save them. Jade Philpott (10), John Philpott (9), Jack Philpott (7), Jesse Philpott (6) and Jayden Philpott (5) were all killed in the fire; post-mortem tests revealed the children died of smoke inhalation. Their half-brother, Duwayne Philpott (13) died in hospital two days later. Jade, John, Jack, and Jesse attended St George's Catholic Primary School, and Duwayne was a student at Saint Benedict Catholic School.

Police confirmed that the fire was started deliberately, with petrol underneath the letterbox, in an act of arson, stating that "Initial indications are that it was deliberately set and as a result six children have been unlawfully killed."

A church service was held in memory of the children at the Catholic church of St George's in Littleover. A charity, Catch Me When I Fall, was set up by local residents to help the family of the children. A book of condolence at Derby Cathedral was later signed by hundreds of people.

Arrests
A 38-year-old man and a 28-year-old woman were arrested on suspicion of murder, but were later released without charge following questioning. Following the release of the pair Assistant Chief Constable Steve Cotterill  said that "While I thank those members of the community who have come forward with information I am surprised by how few people have contacted us. Normally in cases of this scale more information is passed to the police...I strongly suspect that there is someone out there in the community who knows more than we are being told."

The parents of the children, Mick and Mairead Philpott, were arrested on suspicion of murder on 29 May and charged with their murders the following day.

On 5 November 2012, a 49-year-old man and a 45-year-old man were arrested on suspicion of murder. Later that day, the 45-year-old man, Paul Mosley, was charged with murder. The other man was released without charge. Mosley appeared in court the following day. In December 2012 his charge was downgraded to manslaughter. Paul Mosley had previously been arrested in the enquiry and was released on bail in June 2012. He was re-arrested and charged when petrol was found on his clothing following further forensic examination.

Trial
The criminal trial began on 12 February 2013 at Nottingham Crown Court before judge Kathryn Thirlwall. Richard Latham QC led the prosecution on behalf of the Crown Prosecution Service. Anthony Orchard QC led the defence for Mick Philpott, Sean Smith QC led the defence for Mairead Philpott, and Benjamin Nolan QC led the defence for Mosley.  On 2 April, Mick and Mairead Philpott, along with Paul Mosley, were each found guilty of the manslaughter of the six children. On 4 April, Philpott received a sentence of life imprisonment, and will serve a minimum of 15 years, while his wife and Mosley received 17 years imprisonment for their part.

See also 
 Killamarsh killings (2021)
 Shiregreen child murders (2019)
 Ughill Hall shootings (1986)

References

2012 crimes in the United Kingdom
2012 disasters in the United Kingdom
2012 fires in the United Kingdom
2012 in England
2010s in Derby
2010s trials
Arson in England
Arson in the 2010s
Attacks on buildings and structures in 2012
Attacks on buildings and structures in England                               
Building and structure fires in England
Buildings and structures in the United Kingdom destroyed by arson
Crime in Derby
Filicides in England
Manslaughter in England
Manslaughter trials
May 2012 crimes
May 2012 events in the United Kingdom
Residential building fires
Trials in England
Urban fires in the United Kingdom